The Pakistan national handball team is controlled by the Pakistan Handball Federation and represents Pakistan in international tournaments.

Historical results
Pakistan is most successful handball team of South Asia, winning 2 gold and 1 silver medal at the South Asian Games ahead of their arch rivals India. Pakistan won gold in the 2010 and 2019 edition of the South Asian Games beating India by 37–31 and 30–29 respectively.  In the 2016 edition, Pakistan unfortunately lost to the hosts India, score being 32–31.

Honours
Following is the list of honours claimed by Pakistan national handball team:

Current squad
Squad for the 2019 South Asian Games.

Head coach: Naseer Ahmed

References

External links
Official Website
IHF profile

Men's national handball teams
Handball